Van Andel Arena is a 12,000 plus seat multi-purpose arena, situated in the Heartside district of Grand Rapids, Michigan, United States. The arena attracted over five million patrons in its first 5 years, 1996–2001. It serves as the home of the Grand Rapids Griffins of the American Hockey League and the Grand Rapids Gold of the NBA G League. Van Andel Arena is the fourth-largest arena in Michigan, as well as West Michigan's largest; only Little Caesars Arena in Detroit, the Jack Breslin Student Events Center in East Lansing, and the Crisler Center in Ann Arbor, Michigan, are larger.

Background
After a $78 million construction effort, the arena opened on October 8, 1996. The 12,000 plus seat arena is managed by ASM Global. It was named in recognition of the largest benefactors, Jay and Betty Van Andel.

It is home to the Grand Rapids Griffins of the American Hockey League, the top minor league affiliate of the Detroit Red Wings, with fans giving it the nickname "The Freezer on Fulton". It is also home to the Grand Rapids Gold of the NBA G League, the minor league affiliate of the Denver Nuggets. 

The arena was the home court of the now defunct Grand Rapids Hoops of the Continental Basketball Association from 1996 to 2001 and the Grand Rapids Rampage of the Arena Football League from 1998 to 2009. 

It has been hosts to acts such as Taylor Swift, Bob Dylan, Tom Petty, Eric Clapton, Pearl Jam, Green Day, Metallica, Phish, Slipknot, Jack White, Bruce Springsteen, Paul McCartney, Phil Collins, Eagles, Britney Spears, Janet Jackson, Aerosmith, Ariana Grande, Elton John, Lady Gaga, Demi Lovato, Roger Waters, The Who, Kiss, Mötley Crüe, Red Hot Chili Peppers, Avenged Sevenfold, Rush, TLC, Marilyn Manson, Kenny Chesney, OneRepublic, Kid Rock, Katy Perry, P!nk, TobyMac, Trans-Siberian Orchestra, For King & Country, Newsboys, Morgan Wallen, The Harlem Globetrotters, World Wrestling Entertainment, All Elite Wrestling, Disney, Disney on Ice, NCAA Hockey Regional Championships, the AFL ArenaBowl XV game, professional boxing and basketball exhibition games for the Detroit Pistons, Michigan State University Basketball & Grand Valley State University.

On October 20, 2001, during a show co-headlining with Slipknot, System of a Down bassist Shavo Odadjian was assaulted, racially profiled and escorted out of the arena by security guards working for DuHadway Kendall. He filed a lawsuit in 2003.

Description 
As a concert venue, the Van Andel Arena seats 12,858 for end-stage shows, and 13,184 for center-stage shows. The arena floor measures  and features 9,886 permanent seats, of which 1,800 are club seats and 44 luxury suites, with the 16 luxury suites in the upper bowl seating 20 each, and the lower 24 bowls seating 15, and the others at 18. In addition, there are 1,300 retractable seats.

In popular culture 
The arena and Grand Rapids Griffins are featured briefly in a sketch on the comedy show Nick Swardson's Pretend Time, in which Nick attempts to propose but is instead repeatedly hit in the face with hockey pucks.

The arena was also the setting for System of a Down's 2005 music video for their single, "Hypnotize".

References

External links

 Official website
 Grand Rapids Griffins
 Grand Rapids Gold

Sports venues completed in 1996
Indoor arenas in Michigan
Sports venues in Michigan
Grand Rapids Gold
Grand Rapids Griffins
Sports in Grand Rapids, Michigan
Buildings and structures in Grand Rapids, Michigan
Economy of Grand Rapids, Michigan
NBA G League venues
Indoor ice hockey venues in Michigan
Basketball venues in Michigan
College ice hockey venues in the United States
Continental Basketball Association venues
Gymnastics venues in the United States
1996 establishments in Michigan